Ilex sinica is a species of flowering plant in the holly family Aquifoliaceae, native to Yunnan and Guangxi provinces of China. A morphological and genetic study showed that it is basal in its genus.

References

sinica
Endemic flora of China
Flora of Yunnan
Flora of Guangxi
Plants described in 1950